Hook–Powell–Moorman Farm is a historic farm complex and national historic district located near Hales Ford, Franklin County, Virginia.  It encompasses three contributing buildings and 10 contributing sites.  The buildings are the Greek Revival-style farmhouse (c. 1855); a one-story frame building with Georgian detailing identified as the John Hook Store (c. 1784); and the Dr. John A. Moorman Office (c. 1890).  The sites are those of an ice house, carriage house, workshop, barn, outbuilding, original site of the store, a house, spring, ice pond, and road bed.

It was listed on the National Register of Historic Places in 1995.

References

External links
 Hook–Powell–Moorman Farm, Hook's Store, VA 122 & SR 950 (Dovetail Lane), Hales Ford (historical), Franklin County, VA at the Historic American Buildings Survey (HABS)

Farms on the National Register of Historic Places in Virginia
Historic districts in Franklin County, Virginia
National Register of Historic Places in Franklin County, Virginia
Historic American Buildings Survey in Virginia
Historic districts on the National Register of Historic Places in Virginia